The 7th Moscow International Film Festival was held from 20 July to 3 August 1971. The Golden Prizes were awarded to the Italian film Confessions of a Police Captain directed by Damiano Damiani, the Japanese film Live Today, Die Tomorrow! directed by Kaneto Shindo and the Soviet film The White Bird Marked with Black directed by Yuri Ilyenko.

Jury
 Grigori Kozintsev (USSR - President of the Jury)
 Chinghiz Aitmatov (USSR)
 Paulin Soumanou Vieyra (Senegal)
 Sergei Gerasimov (USSR)
 Erwin Geschonneck (East Germany)
 Karel Zeman (Czechoslovakia)
 Giuliano Montaldo (Italy)
 James Aldridge (Great Britain)
 Galsaniin Rinchensambu (Mongolia)
 Armando Robles Godoy (Peru)
 Beata Tyszkiewicz (Poland)
 Youssef Chahine (Egypt)

Films in competition
The following films were selected for the main competition:

Awards
 Golden Prize:
 Confessions of a Police Captain by Damiano Damiani
 Live Today, Die Tomorrow! by Kaneto Shindo
 The White Bird Marked with Black by Yuri Ilyenko
 Golden Prize for Direction: Andrzej Wajda for The Birch Wood
 Silver Prizes:
 Emitaï by Ousmane Sembène
 The Key by Vladimír Čech
 In the Family by Paulo Porto
 Special Prizes:
 Goya or the Hard Way to Enlightenment by Konrad Wolf
 The Days of Water by Manuel Octavio Gómez
 Prizes:
 Best Actor: Daniel Olbrychski for The Birch Wood
 Best Actor: Richard Harris for Cromwell
 Best Actress: Ada Rogovtseva for Hail, Mary!
 Best Actress: Idalia Anreus for The Days of Water
 Diplomas:
 Ensemble of actors for Son-in-Law
 Young actress: Kin Zung for Girl Nyun
 Prix FIPRESCI: The Days of Water by Manuel Octavio Gómez
 Special Mention: Little Big Man by Arthur Penn (non-competition film)

References

External links
Moscow International Film Festival: 1971 at Internet Movie Database

1971
1971 film festivals
1971 in the Soviet Union
1971 in Moscow